Factory Girl or Factory Girls may refer to: 

Film
Factory Girl (2006 film), an American film
Factory Girl (2013 film), an Egyptian film
The Match Factory Girl, a Finnish–Swedish film

Music
Factory Girls (album), a 2006 album by Dallas Crane
"Factory Girl" (Rolling Stones song), a song by The Rolling Stones
"Factory Girl" (folk song), a traditional Irish song
"Factory Girl", a song by The Pretty Reckless on their album Light Me Up
"Factory Girl", a song by Xiu Xiu on their album Always
"Factory Girls", a song by Flogging Molly on their album Within a Mile of Home

Other uses
Factory Girl (Rails Testing), a testing framework for Ruby on Rails
The Factory Girls, a Frank McGuinness play
Factory Girls a 2008 book by Leslie Chang
Factory Girl (TV series), a South Korean TV series

See also
Rosie the Riveter